Muyombe is a rural community town on the M14 Road in Mafinga District, a district east of Isoka, Zambia, and it is the biggest settlement in the region, near the Mafinga Hills. The chiefdom is sparsely populated over an area of 625 square miles (1619 square kilometres).

References 
World Search location map of Muyombe 
Bond, G.C, (2012). Historical Fragments and Social Constructions in Northern Zambia: A Personal Journey. New York: Columbia University.

Populated places in Muchinga Province